Es with diaresis (С̈ с̈; italics: С̈ с̈) is an additional letter of the Cyrillic script which was used in the Bashkir alphabet of . It is composed of the letter es  with a diaresis. It was notably used in a  Bashkir translation of the gospel by the Bible society published in 1902.

Computing codes 
Being a relatively recent letter, not present in any legacy 8-bit Cyrillic encoding, the letter С̈ is not represented directly by a precomposed character in Unicode either; it has to be composed as С+◌̈ (U+0308).

Bibliography 

 
 
Cyrillic letters with diacritics
Letters with diaeresis